The Senate Foreign Relations Subcommittee on Near East, South Asia, Central Asia, and Counterterrorism is one of seven subcommittees of the Senate Foreign Relations Committee.

Jurisdiction
This subcommittee deals with all matters concerning U.S. relations with the countries of the Middle East, North Africa, South Asia, and Central Asia, as well as regional intergovernmental organizations.  This subcommittee’s regional responsibilities include all matters within the geographic region, including matters relating to: (1) terrorism and non-proliferation; (2) crime and illicit narcotics; (3) U.S. foreign assistance programs; and (4) the promotion of U.S. trade and exports.

In addition, this subcommittee has global responsibility for counterterrorism matters.

Members, 117th Congress

See also

U.S. House Financial Services Subcommittee on the Middle East and South Asia

External links
Senate Committee on Foreign Relations
Senate Foreign Relations Committee subcommittees and jurisdictions

 

Foreign Relations Senate Near Eastern and South and Central Asian Affairs